Horipsestis mushana is a moth in the family Drepanidae. It is found in the Chinese provinces of Shaanxi, Hubei, Hunan, Fujian and Sichuan and in Japan, Taiwan and Vietnam.

Subspecies
Horipsestis mushana mushana (Taiwan)
Horipsestis mushana schintlemeisteri Laszlo, G. Ronkay, L. Ronkay & Witt, 2007 (Vietnam)

References

Thyatirinae
Moths described in 1931